The Cairo Championships or  Championships of Cairo was a men's and women's international clay court tennis tournament founded circa 1932. It was played in Cairo, Egypt. The tournament ran until 1972.

History
The Cairo Championships or sometimes called Championships of Cairo was a men's and women's international clay court tennis tournament founded circa 1932. The championships were first played at the Gezira Sporting Club, Cairo, Egypt. In the 1950s the tournament was held at Tawfikiya Tennis Club (f. 1896), Cairo, before returning to the Gezira Sporting Club. The tournament was staged until the early 1970s.

Finals

Men's singles
(incomplete roll)

Women's Singles
(incomplete roll)

References

Clay court tennis tournaments
Defunct tennis tournaments in Egypt